Olenus is one of a number of figures in Greek mythology.

Olenus may also refer to:
Olenus (Achaea), a city of ancient Achaea, Greece
Olenus (Aetolia), a city of ancient Aetolia, Greece
Olenus (Galatia), a city of ancient Galatia, now in Turkey
Olenus (trilobite), a genus of trilobites